HR 3803 or N Velorum (N Vel) is a 3rd-magnitude star on the border between the southern constellations Carina and Vela. It is an orange-hued K-type giant star and has twice the mass of the Sun. At the estimated distance of HR 3803, this yields a physical size of about 29 times the radius of the Sun.

In 1752, French astronomer Nicolas Louis de Lacaille divided the former constellation Argo Navis into three separate constellations, and then referenced its stars by extending Bayer's system of star nomenclature; this star was given the designation N Velorum. In 1871 Benjamin Apthorp Gould discovered this star to be variable, but this occurred prior to the standardization of variable star nomenclature by German astronomer Friedrich Wilhelm Argelander during the nineteenth century, so it does not fall into the standard range of variable star designations.

References

Velorum, N
082668
K-type giants
Vela (constellation)
3803
046701
Durchmusterung objects